Redneck Souljers are an American country rap duo from Winchester, Tennessee, composed of rappers Wesley "Fatt Tarr" Alonso and Chris "C-Hubb" Walls. They were formed in 2009 as a novelty act, parodying popular hits and remixing songs in a hick-hop style, then in 2013 they went "serious" with their debut Tiller Gang release. Their first full-length studio album, Firewater, debuted on the Billboard charts.

Discography 
Studio albums

Extended plays

References

External links
Redneck Souljers on Discogs

American musical duos
Musical groups established in 2009
Country rap musicians
People from Winchester, Tennessee